The Chattanooga Shale is a geologic formation in Alabama, Arkansas, Kentucky, Missouri and Tennessee. It preserves conodont fossils dating to the Devonian Period. It occurs mostly as a subsurface geologic formation composed of layers of shale. It is located in Eastern Tennessee and also extends into southeastern Kentucky, northeastern Georgia, and northern Alabama. This part of Alabama is part of the Black Warrior Basin.

The Chattanooga Shale of east Tennessee is reported to be an extension of or correlates with the Marcellus Shale of the Appalachian region to the east.  Exploratory drilling  of the Chattanooga Shale in east Tennessee indicates that it contains significant amounts of natural gas. This has resulted in interest in and attempts to use hydraulic fracturing to exploit the resource.

See also

 List of fossiliferous stratigraphic units in Alabama
 List of fossiliferous stratigraphic units in Georgia (U.S. state)
 List of fossiliferous stratigraphic units in Indiana
 List of fossiliferous stratigraphic units in Kentucky
 List of fossiliferous stratigraphic units in Missouri
 List of fossiliferous stratigraphic units in Ohio
 List of fossiliferous stratigraphic units in Tennessee

References

Devonian geology of Tennessee
Devonian System of North America
Devonian Alabama
Devonian Arkansas
Devonian Georgia (U.S. state)
Devonian Indiana
Devonian Kentucky
Devonian Missouri
Devonian Ohio
Shale formations of the United States
Oil shale in the United States
Oil-bearing shales in the United States
Oil shale formations
Devonian southern paleotemperate deposits